Richard W. "Dickie" Small (December 2, 1945 – April 4, 2014) was an American Thoroughbred horse racing trainer. Raised in the industry, his father, Douglas Small Jr., was a successful trainer as was his uncle, Sidney Watters Jr., a National Museum of Racing and Hall of Fame inductee.

Richard Small learned the business from his father but the Vietnam War temporarily interrupted his career when he served three years with the army Green Berets. Following his discharge from military service, he returned to take over his father's stable in 1974.

A highlight of Small's career was his 1994 win of the $3 million Breeders' Cup Classic with Concern. Ridden by Jerry Bailey, the three-year-old colt was owned and bred by Robert Meyerhoff.

Small won 1,199 races over a 40-year career, including the 1994 Breeders' Cup Classic. He died at his Monkton, Maryland home at the age of 68 in 2014.

References

1945 births
2014 deaths
United States Army personnel of the Vietnam War
American horse trainers
Sportspeople from Baltimore
People from Monkton, Maryland
United States Army soldiers